Nathanel "Nate" Johnson (born September 8, 1977) is an American professional basketball player who last played for Al-Ahli Jeddah in Saudi Arabia. He previously played for Al Riyadi Beirut and Hekmeh (Sagesse) in the Lebanese Basketball League.

References

External links
Asia-Basket.com Profile
Italian League Profile 

1977 births
Living people
American expatriate basketball people in France
American expatriate basketball people in Italy
American expatriate basketball people in Jordan
American expatriate basketball people in Lebanon
American expatriate basketball people in Saudi Arabia
American expatriate basketball people in South Korea
American expatriate basketball people in the Philippines
American expatriate basketball people in Turkey
Cincinnati Stuff players
Darüşşafaka Basketbol players
Louisville Cardinals men's basketball players
Pallacanestro Cantù players
Basketball players from Camden, New Jersey
STB Le Havre players
Goyang Carrot Jumpers players
Seoul Samsung Thunders players
Philippine Basketball Association imports
Small forwards
San Miguel Beermen players
American men's basketball players
Sagesse SC basketball players
Al Riyadi Club Beirut basketball players